Luis Roberto Mercedes Santana (February 15, 1968 – June 30, 2019) was a Major League Baseball outfielder who played for the Baltimore Orioles and San Francisco Giants from  to .

Career
He began his professional career in 1988 with the Bluefield Orioles.

After his time in the major leagues, Mercedes played with the Leones de Yucatan and Olmecas de Tabasco of the Mexican League and the Calgary Cannons of the Pacific Coast League in 1995 and 1996. He died on June 30, 2019 in San Pedro de Macoris, Dominican Republic due to complications from diabetes.

References

Further reading
Johnson, Lloyd and Wolff, Miles, editors: Encyclopedia of Minor League Baseball. Durham, N.C. Publisher: Baseball America, 2007. Format: Hardback, 767 pp.

External links

1968 births
2019 deaths
Baltimore Orioles players
Dominican Republic expatriate baseball players in the United States
Hagerstown Suns players

Major League Baseball outfielders
Major League Baseball players from the Dominican Republic
San Francisco Giants players
Sportspeople from San Pedro de Macorís